The National Agency for Administrative City Construction (NAACC) is an organization under the Ministry of Land, Infrastructure and Transport responsible for completing the Multifunctional Administrative City (MAC) in Sejong City. It was founded in 2006 and is located in Sejong City. The Agency is led by vice-ministerial-level administrator.

Unlike many other government organisations which are founded by the Government Organization Act, the Agency is founded by the special law exclusively dealt with Sejong City. Hence, the agency exclusively deals with issues related to MAC, a government complex in Sejong, and its planning and construction. However, before the Sejong City Government officially commenced its operation in 2012, it temporarily managed administrative duties of the whole Sejong.

With initial relocation of administrative agency to MAC completed, the agency is given another project of planning and constructing the regional branch of the National Assembly currently located in Seoul.

Upon MAC project's completion, it is expected that the agency will be dissolved as a division of either the Ministry of central government or Sejong city government.

Its first head, Lee Choon-hee, is currently a two-term mayor of Sejong.

History 

 April 2005: Presidential Committee on Promoting Multifunctional Administrative City created
 January 2006: NAACC founded under then-Ministry of Construction and Transport
 July 2007: Ground-breaking Ceremony of the MAC
 February 2008: re-organised under then-Ministry of Land, Transport and Maritime Affairs
 December 2012: moved to its current headquarter in Sejong
 March 2013: re-organised under Ministry of Land, Infrastructure and Transport

See also 

 Sejong City

References

External links
Official English website

Government agencies of South Korea
Sejong City